Afshin Nazemi (born 20 February 1971 in Sowme'eh Sara, Iran) is an Iranian football coach and retired player who is currently manager of Gilanmehr Fouman.

Playing career
He began his career as a football player in 1990 with Esteghlal Rasht. After two years, he joined the first team squad and played for the team for ten years, then moved to Pegah and played three years for the team. He retired in July 2006.

Managerial career
He became assistant manager of Damash Gilan, a new club who was established after the dissolution of Pegah. The first head coach who Nazemi worked with was Bijan Zolfagharnasab, then he worked with Hossein Abdi, Stanko Poklepović, Firouz Karimi, Markar Aghajanian and Marijan Pušnik. After Pušnik was sacked in July 2010, Nazemi was appointed as the caretaker head coach of the club. After Mehdi Dinvarzadeh was signed as the new head coach, he returned to his assistant role and worked with him. Then Ebrahim Ghasempour, Mehdi Tartar, Omid Harandi and Hamid Derakhshan. When Derakhshan was sacked by the club, Nazemi was appointed as caretaker manager of the club to lead the team until the end of the season. After his good results, he was confirmed by club chairman, Amir Abedini to lead the team in 2013–14 season. However, Nazemi was sacked as Damash manager on 26 January 2014 after six consecutive defeats.

Managerial Statistics

References

1971 births
Living people
Iranian footballers
Iranian football managers
Sportspeople from Gilan province
Damash Gilan managers
Association football midfielders